Saikyō Maru (西京丸) was a steamship that was built in 1888 in Scotland for Japanese merchant service. She was requisitioned for service in the First Sino-Japanese War of 1894–95 and the Russo-Japanese War of 1904–05. She was scrapped in 1927.

Building
The London and Glasgow Engineering and Iron Shibuilding Company built Saikyō Maru in its shipyard in Govan, Glasgow. She was launched on 14 March 1888. She had a three-cylinder triple expansion steam engine that was rated at 563 NHP.

Saikyō Marus first owner was Nippon Yusen KK, who registered her in Tokyo. Her code letters were HGQF.

Career
In 1894 the Japanese government requisitioned Saikyō Maru and had her armed with one 120mm, one 57 mm and two 47mm guns to serve as an armed merchant cruiser and transport ship. She carried Admiral Viscount Kabayama Sukenori in the 1894 Battle of the Yalu River, and was commanded by John Wilson. She towed the captured ironclad battleship  from Weihaiwei to Port Arthur. In 1895 she was returned to her owners and resumed civilian service.

In 1904 she was requisitioned for the Russo-Japanese War as a transport. In February 1905 she was converted into a hospital ship in February 1905. She was later returned to her owners.

In 1923 Kuribayashi Shosen KK bought Saikyō Maru. She was scrapped in the third quarter of 1927.

References

1888 ships
First Sino-Japanese War naval ships of Japan
Hospital ships of Japan
Merchant ships of Japan
Russo-Japanese War naval ships of Japan
Ships built in Glasgow
Steamships of Japan
World War I passenger ships of Japan